Coulommiers may refer to:

 Coulommiers cheese, a soft ripened cheese from Coulommiers in the Seine-et-Marne department of France.
 Gare de Coulommiers, a railway station serving the town Coulommiers in the Seine-et-Marne department of France.
 Canton of Coulommiers,  a French administrative division, located in the arrondissement of Meaux, in the Seine-et-Marne department of France.
 Coulommiers – Voisins Aerodrome, an airport serving Coulommiers in the Seine-et-Marne department of France.
 Coulommiers, Seine-et-Marne, a commune in the Seine-et-Marne department in France.